Chenaruiyeh or Chenarooeyeh or Chenaruyeh may refer to:
 Chenaruiyeh, Fars
 Chenaruyeh, Neyriz, Fars Province
 Chenaruiyeh, Ravar, Kerman Province
 Chenaruiyeh, Heruz, Ravar County, Kerman Province
 Chenarooeyeh, Shahr-e Babak, Kerman Province
 Chenaruiyeh, Zarand, Kerman Province